Guchkuliya is a small village situated  north-east from Jaijaipur tahsil in Janjgir-Champa district in the Indian state of Chhattisgarh.

Geography

Demographics

As of 2001 Indian census, Guchkuliya had a population of 1093. Males constitute 49% of the population and females 51%. Guchkuliya has an average literacy rate of 58%, lower than the national average of 59.5%: male literacy is 68, and female literacy is 45%.

References

Villages in Janjgir-Champa district